Erzgebirgsstadion is a multi-purpose stadium in Aue, Germany. It is currently used mostly for football matches and is the home stadium of FC Erzgebirge Aue. The stadium is able to hold 16,485 people and was built in 1950.

History 
The earliest stadium on this site was known the "Städtisches Stadion" and was opened on 29 May 1928. It was opened as a multi-purpose sports venue, featuring a playing field and an athletics track. 

After the establishment of the German Democratic Republic, the stadium was completely rebuilt in 1950 over a 4-month period. The stadium was opened on 20 August 1950 and was named "Otto Grotewohl Stadium", in honour of the then East German Prime Minister, Otto Grotewohl. Between 1986 and 1992, the stadium was subject to large-scale renovations, and the stadium was renamed to Erzgebirgsstadion in 1991. The stadium has since been redeveloped in 2010, and again in 2017.

Gallery

References

External links 

Football venues in Germany
Athletics (track and field) venues in Germany
Multi-purpose stadiums in Germany
FC Erzgebirge Aue
Aue
Sports venues in Saxony
Buildings and structures in Erzgebirgskreis
Sports venues completed in 1928
Sports venues completed in 1950